In public law, abrogation is the proposing away of a right, power or value, by a public body in delegating power or failing to carry out a responsibility or duty. The abrogation of such a responsibility or duty, unless required by primary legislation would amount to an unconstitutional delegation of power to a foreign government or other sovereign power.

It is a protected value at Common Law that Parliament has legislative supremacy even to the point that the sovereign power extends to the breaking of treaties, if need be.

Delegation of responsibility

In the judicial review R (on the application of Andrew Michael March) v Secretary of State for Health which challenged the UK Department of Health's decision not to implement Recommendation 6(h) of the Archer Independent Inquiry
, there was reference to abrogation in the 2009 legal papers of both the defendant and the claimant which led up to the hearing the following year. The claim form, dated 18 August 2009, originally included the additional ground that Government took into account irrelevant considerations. The claimant suggested that Government had abrogated their responsibility: ″In basing the Decision on its own assessment of fault the Government has taken an irrelevant consideration into account and thereby abrogated its responsibility to the victims to compensate them adequately for living with HIV and/or Hepatitis C.″

In contrast, the Defendant's Summary Grounds of Defence claimed that implementing Recommendation 6(h) would be impractical and unworkable, and asserted that: 
"...It would require the Defendant to abrogate decision-making responsibility for the level of ex gratia payments in the UK and defer to the resourcing decisions by the government of another sovereign state operating under different fiscal constraints and policy circumstances. This would itself be irrational and would constitute an unconstitutional delegation of power to a foreign government."

Constitutionality
The fundamental right of the British people to be governed by an elected legislature and the executive of the United Kingdom should not be violated by anything more than a vesting of law-making responsibility in a delegate power through an Act of Parliament. Parliamentary governing power and the responsibility for law-making should not be abrogated by the transfer of responsibility away from the United Kingdom. 

In McWhirter & Anor, R (on the application of) v Secretary of State for Foreign and Commonwealth Affairs [2003], at [17], Lady Justice Arden suggested that the principle that it was not permissible to transfer responsibility for law making and government away from the United Kingdom did not necessarily vitiate Parliamentary supremacy. The reasoning given for the dismissal of this application suggests that abrogation of power may be permissible in certain situations. A possible scenario may arise where Parliament may choose to implement prospective legislation that may not be fully in accordance with existing statute; such as the European Communities Act 1972 or the European Communities (Amendment) Act 2002, and as such, Parliament′s unfettered law–making power will not have fully transferred all rights to European bodies under the respective statutes.

Scope of constitutional right
Within the United Kingdom, the notion of a constitutional right exists despite there being no written constitution. The scope of such a constitutional right is particularly narrow and the State cannot abrogate their power except where a specific piece of legislation or regulation specifically provides for the power to abrogate. As observed in Witham, R (on the application of) v Lord Chancellor [1997], Laws J made it clear that ″General words will not suffice.″  This was applied in Cullen v Chief Constable of the Royal Ulster Constabulary [2003].

Principle of legality
Under the principle of legality Parliament must not abrogate fundamental rights or values at common law by using ″general or ambiguous words″ and it cannot bestow power upon another body to abrogate such rights or values using similarly nonspecific words. The right to vote, as mentioned in Watkins v Home Office & Ors [2006], is an accepted example of a ′constitutional right′, and as such, in explicating legislation where such a right may have been ″proposed away″ it follows that the principle of legality would become engaged.

Prerogative powers and abrogation

In R (Miller) v Secretary of State for Exiting the European Union [2017], it was held that an Act of Parliament would need to be in place before triggering the UK′s exit from the EU under Article 50 of the Treaty on European Union. There would needed to have been specific, clear wording for any exiting legislation to be interpreted as affording ministers the authority to withdraw from the EU under section 2 of the European Communities Act 1972 (UK). The abrogation of powers came up in the UKSC′s reasoning since the government were not at liberty to use prerogative powers to change domestic law, nor were they able to use such powers to undermine any existing rights enshrined in primary legislation. If UK statute had been altered as a result of withdrawing from European Union, it would most likely have caused a fundamental change to the constitutional arrangements of the United Kingdom.

See also
  Unconstitutional actions (Constitutionality)
 R (March) v Secretary of State for Health
 R (Miller) v Secretary of State for Exiting the European Union
 Westphalian sovereignty (exclusive state sovereignty)
 Parliamentary sovereignty (a concept in the constitutional law of some parliamentary democracies)

Notes

References

Public law
Common law
Constitutional law
United Kingdom public law
Law of the United Kingdom
Judicial review
Sovereignty
Legal terminology